Akademiegalerie is an art gallery ("Kunsthalle") in Maxvorstadt, Munich, Bavaria, Germany.

Buildings and structures in Munich
Maxvorstadt